WWE (formerly World Wrestling Federation and World Wrestling Entertainment), an American professional wrestling promotion based in Stamford, Connecticut in the United States owned by the McMahon family, has been promoting events in New Zealand since 2006.

History
WWE held their first live event tour in New Zealand on March 4, 2006, at the Westpac Stadium in Wellington. This was the WWE Smackdown Road to WrestleMania 22 Tour, which featured a main event triple threat match between Kurt Angle, Undertaker and Mark Henry for the World Heavyweight Championship. This event drew 23,875 people.

The following two years, WWE returned to New Zealand for a pair of SmackDown and ECW co-branded shows. In 2009 and 2011 the Raw brand did a one night show in Auckland, with SmackDown doing a show in 2010. The WWE then took a long break between shows in New Zealand and did not return until 2016. At the 2016 show, WWE announced NXT would be doing a show as part of their Oceania tour. Two NXT Live shows were scheduled for December 5 and 6, 2016 at The Trusts Arena in Auckland and the TSB Bank Arena in Wellington. however these were eventually cancelled. The following year, in 2017 the Raw brand returned to New Zealand for one show in Christchurch.

WWE announced the Raw brand would once again return for a live event at Auckland's Spark Arena on August 8, 2020. This show was later postponed three times due to the COVID-19 pandemic, firstly to July 31, 2021, secondly to August 4, 2022, and finally to another date to be announced.

Events in New Zealand
{| class="wikitable"
|-
! Date !! width="170"| Name 
!Brand!! width="120" | Venue !! width="120"| City !! Main event
|-style="background: #BBF;"
| March 4, 2006 || WWE SmackDown Road to WrestleMania 22 Tour
|SmackDown||Westpac Stadium || Wellington || Kurt Angle vs. Mark Henry vs. The Undertaker for the World Heavyweight Championship
|-style="background: #FFFFFF;"
| February 23, 2007 || rowspan="2" | WWE SmackDown Road to WrestleMania 23 Tour 
| rowspan="2" | SmackDown & ECW
|Westpac Centre || Christchurch || rowspan="2" | Batista vs. Mr. Kennedy for the World Heavyweight Championship
|-style="background: #FFFFFF;"
| February 24, 2007 
|Western Springs Stadium||Auckland
|-style="background: #FFFFFF;"
| June 11, 2008 || rowspan="2" | WWE Smackdown ECW Tour 
| rowspan="2" | SmackDown & ECW
|Vector Arena || Auckland || Edge vs. Batista for the World Heavyweight Championship
|-style="background: #FFFFFF;"
| June 12, 2008 
|Westpac Centre||Christchurch|| Matt Hardy, Batista & The Undertaker vs. Edge, Montel Vontavious Porter and Mark Henry
|-style="background: #FBB;"
| July 3, 2009 || WWE Raw Live Tour 
|Raw
|Vector Arena || Auckland || Randy Orton & Big Show vs. John Cena & Triple H
|-style="background: #BBF;"
| August 5, 2010 || WWE SmackDown Live 2010 
|SmackDown
|Vector Arena || Auckland || Kane vs. Rey Mysterio for the World Heavyweight Championship
|-style="background: #FBB;"
| July 6, 2011 || WWE World Tour 
|Raw
|Vector Arena || Auckland || John Cena vs. R-Truth for the WWE Championship
|-style="background: #FFFFFF;"
| August 10, 2016 || WWE Live: New Zealand 
| Unbranded ||Vector Arena || Auckland || Roman Reigns vs. Seth Rollins
|-style="background: #FBB;"
| September 13, 2017 || WWE Live: New Zealand
|Raw
|Horncastle Arena || Christchurch || Roman Reigns vs. Braun Strowman in a Street Fight
|}

WWE Road to WrestleMania 22 Tour

The WWE SmackDown Road to WrestleMania 22 Tour was the first WWE event held in New Zealand and took place at the Westpac Stadium in Wellington, New Zealand, on March 4, 2006. The event was recorded by WWE and aired exclusively on WWE 24/7 in the United States. Michael Cole and Tazz recorded the commentary from WWE headquarters in Stamford, Connecticut.

The event was attended by 23,875. WWE talent and management were impressed with the reactions and excitement by the audience, and also the large size of the stadium. “Holy Cow, this is a coliseum, not an arena,” was one of the WWE wrestler's remarks when entering inside New Zealand's second-largest stadium.

Results

Other on-screen personnel

Commentators
Michael Cole
Tazz
Ring Announcer
Tony Chimel
Referee
Nick Patrick
Charles Robinson
Jimmy Korderas

Broadcast
The WWE and Sky have had an agreement to carry WWE programming in New Zealand since the late 1990s.

In August 2014, WWE Network launched in New Zealand.

References

Notes 

Professional wrestling in New Zealand
New Zealand